Louis François Cordiez (3 February 1813 – 31 May 1884) was a 19th-century French librarian and playwright. 

An assistant librarian at the Université royale de France as early as September 1832, surnumerary in July 1834, his plays were presented at the Théâtre Beaumarchais and the Théâtre des Variétés. 

When he died in 1885, he bequeathed the Bibliothèque de l'Arsenal a collection of 8000 theatre plays of the 19th century.

Works 
1846: Beaumarchais, historical drama in 3 acts, with Roland Bauchery
1854: Un spahi, comédie-vaudeville in 1 act, with Angel

Bibliography 
 Henry Martin, Histoire de la Bibliothèque de l'Arsenal, 1900, (p. 595)
 William George Aston, Sir Ernest Mason Satow, Basil Hall Chamberlain, Bulletin du bibliophile, 2000, (p. 316)

References 

19th-century French dramatists and playwrights
French librarians
1813 births
Writers from Paris
1884 deaths